Nelson Javier Velázquez (born December 26, 1998) is a Puerto Rican professional baseball outfielder for the Chicago Cubs of Major League Baseball (MLB). He made his MLB debut in 2022.

Career
Velázquez was selected by the Cubs in the fifth round of the 2017 MLB draft. He made his professional debut that year, playing in the rookie-level Arizona League. In 2018, he split time at the Class A Short Season and Class A levels, batting .231 overall for the season; in 103 games, he had 11 home runs and 40 RBIs. In 2019, he mainly played at the Class A level, where he batted .286 with four home runs and 34 RBIs in 72 games. He then played in the Puerto Rican Winter League in the 2019–20 offseason.

Velázquez did not play professionally during 2020, as the minor-league season was cancelled. In 2021, he played 69 games for the South Bend Cubs, a High-A team, and 34 games for the Tennessee Smokies, a Double-A team. Overall, he batted .270 with 20 home runs and 73 RBIs in 103 game; he also stole 17 bases. After the regular season, he played for the Mesa Solar Sox of the Arizona Fall League where he batted .366 with nine home runs and 21 RBIs in 26 games. Velázquez was named MVP of the 2021 Arizona Fall League season, and was also added to the Cubs' 40-man roster following the 2021 season.

Velázquez reached the Triple-A level in 2022 with the Iowa Cubs, and was added to Chicago's active roster prior to a doubleheader on May 30. He made his major-league debut the same day, collecting a hit in his first MLB at bat.

References

External links

1998 births
Living people
People from Carolina, Puerto Rico
Major League Baseball players from Puerto Rico
Major League Baseball outfielders
Chicago Cubs players
Arizona League Cubs players
South Bend Cubs players
Eugene Emeralds players
Criollos de Caguas players
Tennessee Smokies players
Mesa Solar Sox players
Iowa Cubs players
2023 World Baseball Classic players